Lithocarpus glaber, the Japanese oak, is a tree species in the genus Lithocarpus found in Japan, China and Taiwan.

Mitami Shrine, a Shinto shrine in Sakai, Osaka Prefecture, Japan, is famous locally for its comparatively large population of Lithocarpus glaber, known as Shiribukagashi (尻深樫 シリブカガシ). In China, it is called ke (柯). In Cantonese, it is called Seklik (石櫟).

Condensed tannins from L. glaber leaves have been analysed through acid-catalyzed degradation in the presence of cysteamine and have a potent free radical scavenging activity.

See also
 Quercus crispula - Japanese oak - 水楢

References

External links

 

glaber
Plants described in 1784